"Blue Jam" was Japanese singer Bonnie Pink's debut album. It spawned one single but failed to chart. In the jacket of the album, she describes the album as a "mixture of bitter honey, blues music, momentary silence, irresistible madness, teardrops, sourgrapes, hopeful bombs, big big love, and a few green apples." The album introduced her unique style of music that has been defined as an off-beat mix between jazz, blues, pop, and rock.

Track listing

References 

1995 albums
Bonnie Pink albums
Pony Canyon albums